VHT may refer to:

 VHT TrackBite, a resin used in drag racing
 Very High Throughput, in the wireless networking standard IEEE 802.11ac

See also
 HT (disambiguation)